Francisco de Trillo y Figueroa (1618/1620–1680) was a Spanish poet and historian. He was adherent to the Baroque movement Culteranismo and wrote epithalamiums as well as panegyrics. He has been described as a possible influence on Juana Inés de la Cruz.

Biography
Trillo y Figueroa was born in the parish San Pedro de Cerbás, Ares, Spain, to José de Trillo and Juana Flores de León between 1618 and 1620. When Trillo y Figueroa was 11 years old, his family moved to Granada after de Trillo received inheritance from his uncle. He and his brother, Juan, then received an education, including literature, there. He participated in the poetic environment at a young age. This early exposure is attributed as where his mastery in satire derived. His brother became interested in genealogy, publishing Origen de la casa de Tobar y árbol genealógico de don Francisco Cañavera in 1662 and Noticia de la sucesión de doña María Nuñez Cabeza de Vaca in 1664.

He served in Italy for the military and upon his return to Spain dedicated himself to poetry and history.

On 20 November 1640, Trillo y Figueroa married Leonor de Trillo y Figueroa, a distant relative. They had three sons named Juan Francisco, José, and Diego, on 2 February 1643, 16 September 1645, and 29 February 1648, respectively. He was the godfather of his grandson Diego's baptism in 1678.

A death certificate states a "Francisco de Trillos y Figueroa" was buried in parish Santiago, Granada on 25 October 1680, coinciding with the death year in sources.

Works

Published
Epitalamio en las felicísimas bodas de los señores don Francisco Ruto de Vergara y Álava, del consejo de sn majestad, y doña Guiomar Venegas, hija de los condes de Luque, 1649
Epitalamio al himeneo de don Juan Ruiz de Vergara y Dávila, señor de Villoría, y doña Luisa de Córdoba y Ayala, hija de los señores marquese de Valenzuela, 1650
Panegírico natalicio al excelentísimo señor marqués de Montalvan y Villalba, primogénito del excelentísimo señor marqués de Priego, duque de Feria, etc, 1650
Notas al panegírico de el señor marqués  de Montalvan, respondiendo á un curioso  en  otras  facultades, que pidió se le  declarase la idea y argumento de este poema, 1651
Neapolisea, poema heroico y panegírico al gran capitán Gonzalo Fernández de Córdoba, dirigida al excelentísimo señor  don Luis Fernandez de Córdoba y Figueroa, marqués de Priego, 1651
Poesías varias heroicas y satíricas y amorosas, 1652
Panegyrico sacro en la fiesta que celebró la ciudad de Granada, día del Corpus, 1661

Unpublished
Historia política del Rey Católico, 1652
Epítome de la historia del rey Enrique IV de Francia, 1652
Historia y antigüedades del reino de Galicia y su nobleza, 1652
Antigüedades de la ciudad de Granada, 1652
Notas y adversarios á  los  autores de la historia antigua de España, 1652
Discursos políticos y militares, 1652
Cartas, 1652
Discursos cronológicos, 1652
Blasones y armas de la nobleza de España, 1652

References

Bibliography

External links
Spanish poetry in Poetas líricos de los siglos XVI y XVII (pages 45-102)

1618 births
1680 deaths
17th-century Spanish poets
17th-century Spanish historians
People from the Province of A Coruña